Mamuta Art Research Center is an independent center for art research in Jerusalem, Israel.

History 
The Mamuta Art Research Center was established in 2009 by artists and curators in Jerusalem. The Center was initially located in El-Dan House in Ein Kerem, one of Jerusalem suburbs. It moved to Hansen House in Jerusalem in 2012. The center is supported financially by Ostrovsky Family Fund.

Notable projects and exhibitions 
 2014. 'The Eternal Sukkah of the Jahalin tribe'. 
 2018. 'Intersections'. In collaboration with Jerusalem Film Festival. 
 2019 "Barbarians: a censorship archive". Jerusalem
 2019. 'Veterans' by Lola Arias. In collaboration with Jerusalem Film Festival.
 2019. 'Room 235: I Don’t Know If You Understand Me Correctly' by Gabi Kricheli, curated by Sagit Mezamer.

References

Israeli art